Daphnis is a genus of moths in the family Sphingidae first described by Jacob Hübner in 1819.

Distribution
Primarily Indo-Australian origin, the species are widely distributed throughout India, Africa, Europe, Borneo, Java, Sri Lanka and Mauritius. Adults are often found in Europe as immigrant individuals, that can be observed in dispersed localities.

Description
Wings are generally dark green to greenish brown in color. There is a characteristic wing pattern of paler fasciae. Adult with large labial palpus which are upturned, and more rounded at apex. Female has slightly clubbed antenna with a long thin terminal segment. Forewing with pointed apex. Tibial spurs of legs are longer where one pair of tibial spurs found in the mid tibia. Hind tibia has two tibial spur pairs. These tibiae lack spines. There are elongated and weak spines in several abdominal rows. In male genitalia, both uncus and gnathos are strong, and not divided.

Species
Daphnis dohertyi Rothschild, 1897
Daphnis hayesi Cadiou, 1988
Daphnis hypothous (Cramer, 1780)
Daphnis layardii Moore, 1882
Daphnis minima Butler, 1876
Daphnis moorei W.J. Macleay, 1866
Daphnis nerii (Linnaeus, 1758)
Daphnis placida (Walker, 1856)
Daphnis protrudens Felder, 1874
Daphnis torenia Druce, 1882
Daphnis vriesi Hogenes & Treadaway, 1993

Gallery

References

 
Moth genera
Taxa named by Jacob Hübner